Clostridium herbivorans is a Gram-positive, cellulolytic and  motile bacterium from the genus Clostridium which has been isolated from the intestinal tract of pigs.

References

 

Bacteria described in 1995
herbivorans